The 2019–20 Louisiana Ragin' Cajuns men's basketball team represented the University of Louisiana at Lafayette during the 2019–20 NCAA Division I men's basketball season. The Ragin' Cajuns, led by tenth-year head coach Bob Marlin played their home games at the Cajundome as members of the Sun Belt Conference. They finished the season 14–19, 8–12 in Sun Belt play to finish in a three-way tie for eighth place. They defeated Arkansas State in the first round of the Sun Belt tournament before losing in the second round to Georgia Southern.

Previous season
The Ragin' Cajuns finished the 2018–19 season 19–13, 10–8 in Sun Belt play to finish fifth in the conference. The Cajuns proceeded to the Sun Belt Conference Men's Basketball Tournament with a first-round bye. They ultimately lost to the South Alabama Jaguars in heartbreaking fashion by the score of 69–70 in the second round. They were not invited to any other post-season tournament.

Roster

Depth chart

Schedule and results

|-
!colspan=9 style=| Regular season

|-
!colspan=9 style=| Sun Belt tournament

References 

Louisiana Ragin' Cajuns men's basketball seasons
Louisiana-Lafayette
Louisiana
Louisiana